Soname Yangchen (born 1973) is a British singer and a songwriter.

Biography 
Soname Yangchen was born in the Yarlung Valley at the time of the Cultural Revolution in Tibet, into a noble family which was  poorly regarded by the Chinese government. As a child, she was passionate for singing, and was sent to live for 7 years with her aunt in Lhasa. At the age of 16, she left Lhasa and crossed the Himalayas by foot to reach India. Her singing talents were "discovered" during a spontaneous performance at a friend's wedding, and she started singing professionally in England, becoming known worldwide, touring Europe, appearing at festivals in Australia and other places. She began by interpreting the traditional songs of her grandmother, and then songs of her composition. As of 2014, she has published two books. In 2003, she gave a gala at the Royal Opera in London. In September 2004 she performed Tibetan folk and spiritual songs at a world music concert at LSO St Luke's, London.

Publication 
2006: Soname Yangchen, with Vicki Mackenzie, Child of Tibet: the story of Soname's flight to freedom. London: Portrait

References

External links 

 Site officiel
 

1973 births
20th-century Tibetan women singers
Living people
British people of Tibetan descent
21st-century British singers